Gloomcookie is a gothic comic series created and written by Serena Valentino (Nightmares & Fairy Tales) and co-created by Ted Naifeh in 1998, who also illustrated the comic's first six issues. The series functions both as a social satire on real-life Gothic subculture and as a supernatural fantasy. Gloomcookie is irregularly published by Slave Labor Graphics, and ended its run in 2006 after seven years as one of their longest running titles with 28 issues.

References

External links
 Serena Valentino’s official site

Slave Labor Graphics titles
Goth subculture
Horror comics
Fantasy comics
Gothic comics